Omni United Pte. Ltd is a tire manufacturer and distributor headquartered in Singapore. The company designs and produces tires in partnership with manufacturers based in Thailand, Indonesia, China and India. Omni United owns the Radar, Patriot and Corsa brand names, and markets, sells and distributes several other brand names. The company was founded in 2003 by G.S. Sareen, who prior to founding Omni United, was an entrepreneur in the e-commerce industry . Omni United sells in excess of 5 million units of passenger and light truck tires a year in 50 countries. The company has been called the ‘IKEA of Tires' and currently sells more than two million units of passenger and light truck tires a year in the United States.

Omni United began contributing to The Breast Cancer Research Foundation with its ‘Mobilizing Hope’ campaign partnership in 2011 and since then the company has donated over US $1.4 million to the funding of 28,000 hours of research. The company entered into motorsports with its Radar Tires brand in 2013. In November 2014, the company launched Timberland Tires, a partnership with apparel and footwear company Timberland, to create the first tires ever purposely designed to be recycled into the outsoles of Timberland footwear when their life on the road is complete.  Omni United acquired Interstate Tire Distributor, a California-based wholesaler with six locations in four Western states, in October, 2015. In June 2016, the company finalized the acquisition of Texas-based A to Z Tire & Battery, Inc. That business has since been renamed Omnisource. 

Omni United currently sells in excess of 5 million units of passenger and light truck tires in 50 countries. Omni United's manufacturing partners are located in China, Indonesia, Thailand and India. The company currently sells more than two million units of passenger and light truck tires a year in the United States.

Brands 
 
Omni United sells products for passenger car, SUV, trailer, winter and commercial tires under the following main brand names:
 Radar Tires
 Timberland Tires 
 Patriot Tires
 American Tourer [Tires] 
 Roadlux [Tires]
 Corsa [Tires]
 Tecnica [Tires]
 Agora [Tires]

Radar Tires 

The Radar Tires brand is owned by Omni United and was launched in 2006. The brand includes passenger car, SUV, trailer, winter and commercial tires.

Timberland Tires 

Timberland Tires is a collaboration between Omni United and Timberland. The tires feature a rubber formulation that is appropriate for the recycling of the tires at the end of their useful life into outsoles for Timberland shoes.

In May 2016, Timberland Tires won the WGSN Futures award in the category of Sustainable Design. Timberland Tires were also finalists of the 2016 Guardian Awards and also shortlisted as one of the finalists for the Institute for Scrap Recycling Industries 2016 Design for Recycling Award.

Award Recognitions: Timberland Tires

November 2016: Enterprise 50 Award for Innovation & Management - Omni United

May 2016:      WGSN Futures Award: Sustainable Design

May 2016:      Finalist, Guardian Sustainable Business Awards, "Collaboration" category for partnership of Timberland and Omni United

April 2016:      Finalist, Institute for Scrap Recycling Industries 2016 Design for Recycling Award

November 2015:       Enterprise 50 Award for Innovation & Management - Omni United

September 2015:       Ethical Corporation's Sixth Annual Responsible Business Awards, “runner-up” for the “Sustainable Innovation” category

January 2015:       Eco-Business “Top 5 Manufacturing Stories in 2014” - Timberland Tires

January 2015:       Sustainable Brands - Omni United and Timberland recognized as “companies that bravely and brilliantly led the pack.”

35 sizes of the Timberland Cross and 30 sizes of the Timberland A/T are currently available.

Patriot 

The Patriot brand name is owned by Omni United. It was launched in 2016 and is a SUV and LT tire range.

American Tourer 

American Tourer is a brand from Omni United designed to fit passenger vehicles and CUVs.

Omnisource  
Omnisource, formally A to Z Tire and Interstate Tire, was founded in 1926 as Amarillo Bus Company. Omnisource currently manages 2 warehouse locations in Texas and California, supporting wholesale customers, with 100,000 sq. ft. of warehousing space.

Commitment to Sustainability 
President, CEO & Founder G.S. Sareen is highly committed to sustainable business practices. His Radar Tires' branded products were declared Carbon Neutral in October 2013, after a two-year project with Ernst & Young to study the brands global carbon emissions.

With the November 2014 launch of the Timberland Tires brand, Omni United announced a take back and recycling program to convert worn Timberland Tires into new outsoles of Timberland footwear. Liberty Tire Recycling will collect worn Timberland Tires after they have been changed out at authorized Timberland locations and sort the tires at its consolidation centers. From there, the used tires will be shipped to a North American tire recycling facility where they will be recycled into crumb rubber and further processed into sheet rubber for use in Timberland® footwear. The rubber will be mixed into an approved compound for outsoles that will ultimately be incorporated into Timberland® boots and shoes.

The Breast Cancer Research Foundation - corporate partnership 

Since 2011, Radar Tires has supported The Breast Cancer Research Foundation with the Radar Tires [Omni United] Award. The same year, the company released a "Ring of Hope" tire, a limited edition pink-walled version of its Radar RPX 900.

Sports marketing programs

LPGA sponsorship - Jodi Ewart Shadoff 

In 2016, the company announced sponsorship of LPGA player Jodi Ewart Shadoff. As part of the agreement with Omni United, English-born Jodi Ewart Shadoff will wear the Radar Tires brand logo on her golf shirt and other apparel at all tournaments. Jodi continues to represent Radar Tires in the 2020 LPGA season.

Motorsports 

In 2013, Radar Tires entered into the off-road racing and motorsports world in the Lucas Oil Off Road Racing Series, SCORE International Desert Series and TORC: The Off Road Championship. In these series, the company participates in short-course off-road desert racing and long course desert racing. Radar's inaugural season featured the brand's Renegade R5 M/T tire. Radar Tires won the Class 10 at the SCORE International Baja 500.

The company has since expanded both its desert and short-course teams to take multiple wins and podiums in various series.

Radar Tires Wins/Podiums 2013-2018:

2ND PLACE:       Lucas Oil Midwest Racing Series PRO 2 I August 2018 | Daely Pentico

2ND PLACE:       Lucas Oil Midwest Racing Series PRO 2 I July 2018 | Daely Pentico

CHAMPION:       SCORE International (SCORE) Baja 500 Class SCORE LITES I April 2017 | Matt Ferrato

CHAMPION:       SNORE: Motion Tire Ridgecrest 300 I April 2017 | Matt Ferrato

2ND PLACE:       SNORE: Battle at Primm I February 2017 | Richard Glaszczak

CHAMPION:       SNORE: PCI Radios 300 I September 2016 | Richard Glaszczak

3RD PLACE:       SCORE International (SCORE) Rosarito Beach Desert Challenge Class 10 | September 2016 | Lawrence Motorsports

3RD PLACE:       Best in the Desert (BITD) Mint 400 Class 1000 | March 2016 | Coleman Motorsports

2ND PLACE:      SCORE International San Felipe 250 Class SCORE LITES | February 2016 | Matt Ferrato

2ND PLACE:       Best in the Desert (BITD) Parker 425 Class 1000 | February 2016 | Coleman Motorsports

CHAMPION:       SNORE: Rage at the River I December 2015 | Richard Glaszczak

3RD PLACE:       SNORE: Rage at the River I December 2015 | Cody Robinson/Kyle Conlon

CHAMPION:       SNORE: Midnight Special I September 2015 | Richard Glaszczak

CHAMPION:       TORC:The Offroad Championship Crandon Round 15 I September 2015 | Cam Reimers/Cam Reimers Motorsports

3RD PLACE:      SCORE International Imperial Valley 250 Class 10 | September 2015 | Lawrence Motorsports

3RD PLACE:       TORC:The Offroad Championship Sturgis Round 11 I August 2015 | Cam Reimers/Cam Reimers Motorsports

3RD PLACE:       TORC:The Offroad Championship Sturgis Round 10 I August 2015 | Cam Reimers/Cam Reimers Motorsports

CHAMPION:       SNORE: Race Fuel 250 I May 2015 | Richard Glaszczak

CHAMPION:       Best in the Desert (BITD) Silverstate 300 Class 1000 | May 2015 | Cody Robinson/Kyle Conlon

2ND PLACE:      Best in the Desert (BITD) Silverstate 300 Class 1000 | May 2015 | Coleman Motorsports

3RD PLACE:       TORC:The Offroad Championship St. Louis Round 3 I May 2015 | Cam Reimers/Cam Reimers Motorsports

3RD PLACE:       TORC:The Offroad Championship St. Louis Round 2 I May 2015 | Cam Reimers/Cam Reimers Motorsports

2ND PLACE:       SNORE: Battle at Primm I February 2015 | Richard Glaszczak

CHAMPION:       SCORE International Baja 1000 Class 10 | November 2014 | Bronson Motorsports

3RD PLACE:      SCORE International Desert Challenge Class 10 | September 2014 | Robinson Romo Racing Team

2ND PLACE:      SCORE International Desert Challenge Class 10 | September 2014 | Bronson Motorsports

2ND PLACE:	Best In The Desert Series (BITD) | August 2014 | Coleman Motorsports

CHAMPION: 	SCORE International Baja 500 Class 10 | June 2014 | Bronson Motorsports

2ND PLACE: 	SCORE International Imperial Valley 250 Class 10 | April 2014 | Bronson Motorsports

CHAMPION: 	SCORE International San Felipe 250 Class 10 | February 2014 | Robinson Romo Racing Team

CHAMPION:	SCORE International Baja 500 Class 10 | June 2013 | Bronson Motorsports

3RD PLACE: 	SCORE International San Felipe 250 Class 10 | February 2013 | Bronson Motorsports

CHAMPION:       Mojave Off-Road Race (MORE) | January 2013 | Bronson Motorsports

References 

Tire manufacturers of Singapore
Singaporean brands
Manufacturing companies established in 2003
Singaporean companies established in 2003